Divarata is a village and a community in the municipal unit of Pylaros, northern Cephalonia, Greece. It is 5 km northwest of Agia Effimia, 5 km south of Asos and 18 km northeast of Argostoli. The road down to the famous Myrtos Beach originates at the village. The community consists of the villages Divarata, Antypata and Loukata.

Famous residents 
Archie Karas

References 

Populated places in Cephalonia